The bannerfin shiner ('Cyprinella leedsi'') is a species of fish in the family Cyprinidae. It is endemic to the United States,  where it occurs on the Atlantic Slope from the Edisto River drainage in South Carolina to the Altamaha River drainage in Georgia.  It also occurs on the Gulf Slope in the Suwannee and the Oklockonee drainages in southern Georgia and northern Florida.

References

Cyprinella
Taxa named by Henry Weed Fowler
Fish described in 1942